G.P. Vijayakumar commonly known as "Seven arts" Vijayakumar is an Indian film producer, who has produced 43 films so far and distributed 70 Films in various languages since 1985 under the banner of Seven Arts International Ltd. His last film to hit theatres was the Malayalam movie Geethanjali directed by Priyadarshan. He produced many movies with Superstars Mohanlal, Mamooty, Suresh Gopi, Dileep, Prithviraj, Jayaram, and so on under the banner of Seven arts international Ltd, now a famous production house in the Malayalam film industry well known for super hit commercial movies.  Many of his films won regional and national awards in various disciplines. He produced the film “Kuselan" with the superstar Rajinikanth. He also co-produced Hindi Film  ChalChalaChal and line Produced BhoolBhulaiyaa, Dhol, Mere BaapPahleAap, Bum Bum Bole, Khattameetha, and KamaalDhamaalMalamal. Many of his films were in Indian Panorama, represented India in many international festivals.  In fact, he paved a major path for taking Malayalam films to the international markets.

Early Life and Family 

He was born in Kerala, and did his schooling at the RVSM High School, Prayar, Oachira, and received graduation from the  NSS College, Chenganassery. During college, he was elected as the College Union Chairman and University union member.

Career 

Apart from being a successful producer, he also served as the president of the Kerala film chamber, was the vice-president of the Film Federation of India. Presently he is the vice-president of the South Indian Film Chamber of Commerce.  He has also served as a juror in National Film Awards selection 2021 and in many other major film festivals.

Filmography

References

External links
 

Year of birth missing (living people)
Living people
Malayalam film producers